Jhinkijhari is a village in Khordha district  in the state of Odisha, India.

Demographics
 India census, Jhinkijhari had a population of 2015. The village belongs to Nijigarh Tapang Gram panchayat. Nearby villages of Jhinkijhari are Nijigada Tapanga, Anda, Bajapur, Durgapur, Dhaulimuhan, Malipada, etc.

Transportation
The village is accessible through motorable road from Khordha Town which is 10 km away. Nearest Rail head is Khurda Road Junction, which is 23 km away. Bhubaneswar Railway Station is 40.8 km from the village. The village is 3 km from NH 5 at Tapanga Chhak.

Education Facilities
The village is having a school running classes from class I to VII. Children of the village go to Kaviraj Chintamani Vidyapitha, Nijigada Tapange for High school education.

References

Cities and towns in Khordha district